Maurice Deligne (7 October 1861 - 11 July 1939) was a French politician. He served as a member of the Chamber of Deputies from 1928 to 1936, representing Nord. He was also the Minister of Public Works from 27 January 1931 to 16 February 1932.

References

1861 births
1939 deaths
People from Nord (French department)
Politicians from Hauts-de-France
Independent Radical politicians
French Ministers of Public Works
Members of the 14th Chamber of Deputies of the French Third Republic
Members of the 15th Chamber of Deputies of the French Third Republic